Mount Whatley is a community in the Canadian province of New Brunswick, located in  Westmorland County on New Brunswick Highway 16. Mount Whatley is situated upon the Aulac Ridge, a prominent rise running west–east across the Tantramar Marshes on the Isthmus of Chignecto,on the shore of the Missaguash River which forms the southern part of the inter-provincial boundary with Nova Scotia.The community is linked by a small bridge to Fort Lawrence Nova Scotia .

History

Notable people

See also
List of communities in New Brunswick

References

Google Map

Communities in Westmorland County, New Brunswick